A plunge saw or plunge-cut saw is a type of hand-held circular saw which differs from a regular circular saw in that it can plunge into the material to a predetermined depth during the cut. In other words, the depth-of-cut is not fixed and often can be adjusted to be just slightly over the thickness of the board being cut. This property also allows a plunge saw to cut shallow grooves into the workpiece, if necessary. Compared to traditional hand-held circular saws, plunge saws are said to increase operator safety, as well as allowing for reduced splintering and tear-out. Plunge saws are an essential power tool for joiners, carpenters, kitchen fitters and anyone who works with laminates, insulation or needs to make lots of cuts in small work pieces.

Plunge saws vs. track saws vs. circular saws 
Plunge saws usually come with a track system which lets them slide on a guide rail during operation, allowing the operator to perform long and accurate cuts. For this reason, plunge saws are sometimes called track saws. However, any type of hand-held circular saw with attachments for guide rails can be categorized as a track saw, and this feature can thus also be found on some regular circular saws without the plunge-cut feature.

History 
The German power tool manufacturer Festool introduced the first guide rail in 1962, and patented and released the first plunge-cut saw in 1980.

See also 
 Wall chaser

References 

Cutting machines
Metalworking cutting tools
Saws
Woodworking hand-held power tools
Woodworking machines